The Georgia Rail Passenger Program (GRPP) was a set of plans, as yet unbuilt, for intercity and commuter rail in the U.S. state of Georgia.

Commuter Routes
Seven commuter routes were proposed to serve the Atlanta suburbs and nearby cities.

Athens to Atlanta ("Brain Train")
The Athens, Georgia route will connect nine of Georgia's colleges and universities, including Georgia Institute of Technology, Georgia State University, Emory University, Georgia Gwinnett College, and the University of Georgia.  Furthermore, the commuter rail will link the Centers for Disease Control, the new Paul D. Coverdell Center for Biomedical and Health Sciences, as well as the emerging BioScience Corridor along Georgia State Route 316.

The route is estimated to divert 1.8 million drivers from the highways by 2025. As many as 8,000 individuals or more could conceivably use the system every day, and it could remove 5,300 cars daily from already overtaxed roadways during peak travel times.  Also, previous studies have indicated that commuter rail is 25 times safer than driving.

The Georgia Brain Train Group is a non-profit organization with the goal to educate the general public about the opportunities surrounding commuter rail.  The group is made of community activists, business leaders, and professionals from every county and city along the proposed route.  The group is led by self-described entrepreneur, re-developer, and former Georgia state representative Emory Morsberger of the Morsberger Group. Morsberger projects have previously included the revitalization of downtown Lawrenceville.

As currently proposed, the route will cost $383 million as determined by a 2005 estimate.  This price projection includes construction, rail stations, and rail cars.  While tickets sales alone will not fully fund the $5 million in operating costs, it is important to note that no mass transit system in the United States operates without some form of government subsidies. Transit advocates often interpret transit subsidization as parallel to road building, which is typically totally subsidized, although ongoing operating costs may be lower.

Atlanta to Lovejoy and Macon
The Atlanta to Macon route was, as of 2006, seen as the first line ready for implementation, primarily because the railroad owner, Norfolk Southern had shown more interest than had CSX, the owner of the Athens line.  In addition, the Clayton County Commission had offered to fund much of the operating costs of the line, over $106 million in funding was available from the U.S. Department of Transportation, and environmental assessment had been completed.

Funding Delays
In April 2006, a line was slipped into the state budget forbidding the Georgia Department of Transportation (GDOT) from spending any funds on commuter rail without direct approval from the General Assembly.  Rail advocates saw that as a last-minute sabotage of the program, as the General Assembly only meets for 40 days once a year.  In addition, the Clayton County Commission in January 2007 withdrew its commitment to fund the operating costs of the line.

Revived Interest in 2008
There has been revived interest in the Lovejoy line in 2008 and the governor backed it in June.

In January 2008, a delegation of GDOT members visited Philadelphia and Chicago to see how commuter rail systems in those cities was implemented. They also visited the LYNX light rail line in Charlotte.

In early June, that delegation passed a mostly symbolic resolution urging state leaders to pass a transit policy.

In June 2008, under intense pressure from businesses and Atlanta residents along with other politicians, Governor Sonny Perdue backed the Lovejoy line and said he wants it to be pursued aggressively. This may have been partially spurred by a visit the Governor previously had to rep. David Scott's office. David Scott warned that the deadline for acting on the federal dollars would run out soon.

Bremen to Atlanta
The Southern Railway operated this line heading west toward Birmingham, Alabama. The line continues to be used today for Amtrak's Crescent. Into the mid-1960s, the line had local service provided by the Frisco/Southern joint Kansas City-Florida Special and the Southern's #11/#12 train.

Canton to Atlanta
This line of rail will run from Canton and connect into the Western and Atlantic Railroad line that runs from Atlanta to Acworth, then continue along the Western and Atlantic through Marietta, Smyrna, Cumberland, Vinings, and then the Bolton district of Atlanta, West Midtown (near Georgia Tech), then connect into either Midtown via Atlantic Station or continue to Five Points, or both. Outside the city limits of Atlanta along this route, city populations total over 200,000 people if the high-density Cumberland district of Cobb County is included. Additionally, outlying areas would bring even more commuters.

A funding mechanism has been found for build up to Marietta from Atlanta by using future years' revenue from CSX to pay back the initial costs of a quick build-out.

Gainesville to Atlanta
This line included a commuter operation until the early 1930s. It continues to be used by Amtrak for daily passenger service with the Crescent. Into the 1960s the Southern Railway ran this and other trains such as Piedmont Limited, Peach Queen, Southerner, daily along this same route. The Norfolk Southern Railway operates freight service on this line.

Atlanta to Social Circle
Traditionally, this was the Georgia Railroad main line heading east towards Augusta.

Atlanta to West Point
Traditionally, this was the Atlanta and West Point Railroad, heading southwest in the direction of Montgomery, Alabama. Trains such as the Southern Railway's Crescent and Piedmont Limited made stops at West Point and some of the intermediate towns en route.

North Georgia Commuter Rail (NGCR)

The North Georgia Commuter Rail is a new proposed commuter rail network composed of seven lines.

Intercity Routes
Routes proposed for intercity transportation include:
Albany to Jacksonville:
Albany to Tallahassee:
Atlanta to Athens:
Atlanta to Augusta (to Columbia & Charlestown):
Atlanta to Birmingham:
Atlanta to Charlotte:
Atlanta to Chattanooga:
Atlanta to Columbus (High Speed Rail):
Atlanta to Greenville:
Atlanta to Louisville:
Atlanta to Macon:
Atlanta to Montgomery:
Atlanta to Nashville:
Atlanta to Jacksonville:
Augusta to Savannah:
Columbus to Americus:
Griffin to Columbus:
Macon to Savannah:
Macon to Jesup:
Macon to Albany:
Savannah to Jacksonville:

References

External links
Georgia Association of Railroad Passengers
Georgia Brain Train Group
Sierra Club Atlanta Building Environmental Community program - a prominent advocate for commuter rail
Proposed Rail Map

Passenger rail transportation in Georgia (U.S. state)
Transportation in Athens, Georgia
Transportation in Atlanta
Proposed railway lines in the United States